West Quarter Dome is a granodiorite dome, in the Tenaya Canyon area of Yosemite National Park. It is composed of Half Dome Granodiorite.

There are two domes, West Quarter Dome and East Quarter Dome, and they are right next to each other.

Ansel Adams took a photo, Glacial Erratic on East Quarter Dome Showing Half Dome in Background, on East Quarter Dome.

On the locale, and rock climbing

The Quarter Domes are a bit up Tenaya Canyon, are across from Half Dome and Clouds Rest, thus are above Yosemite Valley, quite near to Little Yosemite Valley.

The Quarter Domes offer rock climbing routes, though the approach is difficult. One well-known route is The North Face, which Yvon Chouinard and Tom Frost first climbed in 1962.

References

External links and references

 On East Quarter Dome
 	
Granite domes of Yosemite National Park
Landforms of Yosemite National Park